Andrey Golubev and Aleksandr Nedovyesov were the defending champions but chose not to defend their title.

Mitchell Krueger and Jack Sock won the title after defeating Christian Harrison and Dennis Novikov 4–6, 7–5, [13–11] in the final.

Seeds

Draw

References

External links
 Main draw

2021 ATP Challenger Tour